Yoanka González Pérez (born 9 January 1976 in Villa Clara) is a Cuban racing cyclist, competing in both road cycling and track cycling. She was the 2004 scratch cycling world champion. She is also married to cyclist Pedro Pablo Pérez.

Major results

1995 
2nd  Pursuit, Pan American Games (Mar del Plata, Argentina)
1999 
1st Road Race, National Championship, Cuba
2nd  Road Race, Pan American Games (Winnipeg, Canada)
2nd Road Race, B World Championship (Montevideo, Uruguay)
2001 
1st Road Race, National Championship, Cuba
1st Individual Time Trial, National Championship, Cuba
2003 
1st  Road Race, 2003 Pan American Games (Santo Domingo, Dominican Republic)
2004 
3rd Points race, Moscow, Russia
3rd Individual Time Trial, Pan American Championships
2005 
2nd Points race, Moscow, Russia
1st Scratch Race, Moscow, Russia
2006 
2nd Road Race, National Championship, Cuba
1st Road Race, Central American and Caribbean Sports Games (Cartagena, Colombia)
2nd Points race, Moscow, Russia
3rd Scratch Race, Moscow, Russia
2007 
2nd Points race, Los Angeles, United States of America
1st Points race, Manchester, Great Britain 
3rd Track Points race, Pan American Championships
2nd Points race, Beijing, China
3rd Team Pursuit, Beijing, China
2008 
2nd  Points race, Summer Olympics (Beijing)
2014
2nd  Team Pursuit, Pan American Track Championships (with Yudelmis Dominguez Masague, Yumari Gonzalez Valdivieso and Marlies Mejias Garcia)
Copa Cuba de Pista (Havana, Cuba)
2nd Points Race
3rd Omnium
1st Individual Time Trial National Championship, Cuba

References

External links
 
 
 
 
 
 

1976 births
Living people
Cuban female cyclists
Cuban track cyclists
UCI Track Cycling World Champions (women)
Olympic cyclists of Cuba
Olympic medalists in cycling
Olympic silver medalists for Cuba
Cyclists at the 2000 Summer Olympics
Cyclists at the 2008 Summer Olympics
Medalists at the 2008 Summer Olympics
Pan American Games gold medalists for Cuba
Pan American Games silver medalists for Cuba
Pan American Games bronze medalists for Cuba
Pan American Games medalists in cycling
Cyclists at the 1995 Pan American Games
Cyclists at the 1999 Pan American Games
Cyclists at the 2003 Pan American Games
Cyclists at the 2007 Pan American Games
Cyclists at the 2015 Pan American Games
Medalists at the 2003 Pan American Games
Medalists at the 2007 Pan American Games
Central American and Caribbean Games medalists in cycling
Central American and Caribbean Games gold medalists for Cuba
Central American and Caribbean Games silver medalists for Cuba
Central American and Caribbean Games bronze medalists for Cuba
Competitors at the 1998 Central American and Caribbean Games
Competitors at the 2006 Central American and Caribbean Games
People from Villa Clara Province
20th-century Cuban women
21st-century Cuban women